Anadarko may refer to:

Places
 Anadarko, Oklahoma, a city
 Anadarko Basin, a geologic basin in western Oklahoma and the Texas Panhandle, extending west

Other uses
 Anadarko Daily News, a newspaper in Caddo County, Oklahoma
 Anadarko Independent School District, a school district
 Anadarko Petroleum, a defunct company that engaged in hydrocarbon exploration
 Nadaco, a Caddo tribe from eastern Texas, commonly referred to as the Anadarko

See also
 Amma Darko (born 1956), African novelist
 Grace Hanadarko, the fictional protagonist of Saving Grace